Jefferson Township is a township in Jackson County, Kansas, USA.  As of the 2000 census, its population was 494.

History
Jefferson Township was formed in 1858.

Geography
Jefferson Township covers an area of 36.39 square miles (94.26 square kilometers); of this, 0.04 square miles (0.11 square kilometers) or 0.12 percent is water.

Cities and towns
 Circleville

Adjacent townships
 Wetmore Township, Nemaha County (north)
 Liberty Township (east)
 Franklin Township (southeast)
 Banner Township (south)
 Grant Township (southwest)
 Soldier Township (west)
 Reilly Township, Nemaha County (northwest)

Cemeteries
The township contains one cemetery, Circleville.

References
 U.S. Board on Geographic Names (GNIS)
 United States Census Bureau cartographic boundary files

External links
 US-Counties.com
 City-Data.com

Townships in Jackson County, Kansas
Townships in Kansas